Furcaster is an extinct genus of brittle stars. It lived from the Silurian to Devonian periods. Furcaster palaeozoicus is known from the Hunsrück Slate lagerstätte.

References

External links
 

Oegophiurida
Prehistoric Asterozoa genera